Byford is a surname. Notable people with the surname include:

Andy Byford (born 1965), president of the New York City Transit Authority
Biff Byford (born 1951), English singer, lead vocalist of Saxon
Hazel Byford, Baroness Byford (born 1941), British politician
Mark Byford (born 1958), Deputy Director General of the BBC and head of BBC Journalism
Martin Byford (born 1972), British racing driver
Roy Byford (1873–1939), British actor
Timothy John Byford (1941–2014), English author, actor, film director, translator, and educator
 Wilfred Byford-Jones (1905–1977) was an English writer and English military officer